Michael Edwin Briant (born 14 February 1942) is a retired English television director and author, best known for his work as a director for BBC television drama in the 1970s and 1980s.

Career
At the age of 21 Briant joined the BBC as an assistant floor manager in the drama department and a year later became a production assistant. In 1966, he took a Directors Course. Sometimes credited as just Michael Briant, he subsequently directed series such as Z-Cars  and Doctor Who, directing Jon Pertwee and Tom Baker in a total of six serials: Colony in Space (1971), The Sea Devils (1972), The Green Death (1973), Death to the Daleks (1974), Revenge of the Cybermen (1975) and The Robots of Death (1977). He went on to direct several episodes from the first season of Blake's 7 in 1978, and Secret Army between 1978 and 1979. He later directed four of the six episodes of its sequel, Kessler, and the thriller series Blood Money, in which he cast many of the actors from Secret Army.

Briant's other directing work included a BBC adaptation of Robert Louis Stevenson's Treasure Island, the Emmy-award-winning BBC adaptation of Charles Dickens's story A Tale of Two Cities, the feature film Tangiers, the series Hideaway and many more productions, including Howards' Way and EastEnders. He also spent time directing television in the Netherlands.

Briant discusses his move from acting to directing and his time spent working on Treasure Island in the 2021 YouTube video Director - Michael E Briant

Briant has  been involved with DVD releases of his Doctor Who episodes, appearing on various documentaries and commentary tracks. He has also become a successful author. His autobiography Who is Michael Briant? was published by Classic Press and his books French Canal Routes to the Mediterranean, The Gentle Sailing Route to the Mediterranean, Strait Sailing to Gibraltar and Living Aboard Around the World were published by EdwinEditions.

In 2021 Michael Briant contributed to the documentary tribute Alfred Burke is Frank Marker.

Selected filmography
 Tangiers (1982)

References

External links
 
 Michael Briant's official site

1942 births
English television directors
Living people
Mass media people from Bournemouth